Borbacha pardaria is a moth of the family Geometridae first described by Achille Guenée in 1857. It is found in India (north-east Himalaya), Sundaland, Sulawesi and probably in Sri Lanka,

References

Moths of Asia
Moths described in 1857